Karl Sune Detlof Bergström (10 January 1916 – 15 August 2004) was a Swedish biochemist. In 1975, he was appointed to the Nobel Foundation Board of Directors in Sweden, and was awarded the Louisa Gross Horwitz Prize from Columbia University, together with Bengt I. Samuelsson.
He shared the Nobel Prize in Physiology or Medicine with Bengt I. Samuelsson and John R. Vane in 1982, for discoveries concerning prostaglandins and related substances.

Bergström was elected a member of the Royal Swedish Academy of Sciences in 1965, and its President in 1983. In 1965, he was also elected a member of the Royal Swedish Academy of Engineering Sciences.  He was elected a Foreign Honorary Member of the American Academy of Arts and Sciences in 1966. He was also a member of both the United States National Academy of Sciences and the American Philosophical Society. Bergström was awarded the Cameron Prize for Therapeutics of the University of Edinburgh in 1977. In 1985 he was appointed member of the Pontifical Academy of Sciences. He was awarded the Illis quorum in 1985.

In 1943, Bergström married Maj Gernandt. He had two sons, the businessman Rurik Reenstierna, with Maj Gernandt; and the evolutionary geneticist Svante Pääbo (winner of the 2022 Nobel Prize in Physiology or Medicine), from an extramarital affair with an Estonian chemist Karin Pääbo. Both sons were born in 1955, and Rurik learned about the existence of his half-brother Svante only around 2004.

Orders, decorations and medals 

 Order of the Polar Star
 Illis quorum

References

External links

  including the Nobel Lecture The Prostaglandins: From the Laboratory to the Clinic
 The Official Site of Louisa Gross Horwitz Prize

1916 births
2004 deaths
Swedish biochemists
Nobel laureates in Physiology or Medicine
Members of the Royal Swedish Academy of Sciences
Members of the Royal Swedish Academy of Engineering Sciences
Members of the Pontifical Academy of Sciences
Members of the French Academy of Sciences
Foreign associates of the National Academy of Sciences
Foreign Members of the Russian Academy of Sciences
Academic staff of the Karolinska Institute
Columbia University faculty
Swedish Nobel laureates
Fellows of the American Academy of Arts and Sciences
Recipients of the Albert Lasker Award for Basic Medical Research
Recipients of the Illis quorum
Members of the American Philosophical Society
Members of the National Academy of Medicine